The 1945 Nobel Prize in Literature was awarded to the Chilean poet Gabriel Mistral (1889–1957) "for her lyric poetry, which inspired by powerful emotions, has made her name a symbol of the idealistic aspirations of the entire Latin American world." She is the fifth female and first Latin American recipient of the literature prize.

Laureate

Lucila Godoy Alcayaga borrowed the pseudonym, Gabriela Mistral, from her favorite poets, Gabriele D'Annunzio and Frédéric Mistral. Her poetry is distinguished by intense emotion and straightforward language, having been influenced also by the modernist movement. Affection, deceit, sorrow, nature, travel, and love for children are some of their major themes. Mistral's first prominent poetry collection was Desolación ("Despair"), published in 1922. Ternura ("Tenderness"), published in 1924, contains nursery rhymes and lullabies for children whereas Tala ("Harvesting", 1938) makes use of strange imagery and free verse. She was well-known for writing op-eds for major Chilean newspapers such as El Coquimbo: Diario Radical and La Voz de Elqui. In her country, she became the first female to be awarded the National Prize for Literature.

Deliberations

Nominations
Mistral received eight nominations beginning in 1940. For 1945, she was nominated by the newly inducted Swedish Academy member Elin Wägner (1882–1949) by which she was eventually awarded. In total, the Nobel Committee received 23 nominations for 18 individuals. Four of the nominees were nominated first-time: Thomas Stearns Eliot (awarded in 1948), Yiorgos Theotokas, Edward Morgan Forster, and Marie Under. There were four female nominees namely Elisaveta Bagryana, Maria Madalena de Martel Patrício, Gabriela Mistral and Marie Under.

The French poet Paul Valéry was nominated for the tenth, eleventh and twelfth time by three members of the Swedish Academy. It is believed that the Academy intended to award Valéry the prize in 1945, but he died in July.

The authors Maurice Baring, Ursula Bethell, Robert Brasillach, Dietrich Bonhoeffer, Ernst Cassirer, Mário de Andrade, Margaret Deland, Lucie Delarue-Mardrus, Robert Desnos, Pierre Drieu La Rochelle, Maurice Donnay, Alfred Douglas, E. R. Eddison, Ioan Constantin Filitti, Zinaida Gippius, Ellen Glasgow, Josef Hora, Régis Messac, Arthur Morrison, Otto Neurath, Kitaro Nishida, Charles Gilman Norris, Else Lasker-Schüler, Maria Pawlikowska-Jasnorzewska, Alexander Roda Roda, Felix Salten, Lurana W. Sheldon, Antal Szerb, Aleksey Nikolayevich Tolstoy, Charles Williams died in 1945 without having been nominated for the prize. The Dutch historian Johan Huizinga and Austrian-Bohemian author Franz Werfel died months before the announcement.

Notes

References

External links
 Presentation Speech by Hjalmar Gullberg nobelprize.org

1945